The chital or cheetal (Axis axis), also known as the spotted deer, chital deer and axis deer, is a deer species  native to the Indian subcontinent. It was first described and given a binomial name by German naturalist Johann Christian Polycarp Erxleben in 1777. A moderate-sized deer, male chital reach  and females  at the shoulder. It is sexually dimorphic; males are larger than females, and antlers are present only on males. The upper parts are golden to rufous, completely covered in white spots. The abdomen, rump, throat, insides of legs, ears, and tail are all white.

Etymology
The vernacular name "chital" (pronounced ) comes from cītal, derived from the Sanskrit word  (चित्रल), meaning "variegated" or "spotted". The name of the cheetah has a similar origin. Variations of "chital" include "cheetal" and "cheetul". Other common names for the chital are Indian spotted deer (or simply the spotted deer) and axis deer.

Taxonomy and phylogeny
The chital was first described by Johann Christian Polycarp Erxleben in 1777 as Cervus axis. In 1827, Charles Hamilton Smith placed the chital in its own subgenus Axis under the genus Cervus. Axis was elevated to generic status by Colin P. Groves and Peter Grubb in 1987. The genus Hyelaphus was considered a subgenus of Axis. However, a morphological analysis showed significant differences between Axis and Hyelaphus. A phylogenetic study later that year showed that Hyelaphus is closer to the genus Rusa than Axis. Axis was revealed to be paraphyletic and distant from Hyelaphus in the phylogenetic tree; the chital was found to form a clade with the barasingha (Rucervus duvaucelii) and the Schomburgk's deer (Rucervus schomburgki). The following cladogram is based on a 2006 phylogenetic study:

Fossils of extinct Axis species dating to the early to Middle Pliocene were excavated from Iran in the west to Indochina in the east. Remains of the chital were found in the Middle Pleistocene deposits of Thailand along with sun bear, Stegodon, gaur, wild water buffalo and other living and extinct mammals.

Description

The chital is a moderately sized deer. While immature males weigh , the lighter females weigh .

The species is sexually dimorphic; males are larger than females, and antlers are present only on males.

The dorsal (upper) parts are golden to rufous, completely covered in white spots. The abdomen, rump, throat, insides of legs, ears, and tail are all white. A conspicuous black stripe runs along the spine (back bone). The chital has well-developed preorbital glands (near the eyes) with stiff hairs. It also has well-developed metatarsal glands and pedal glands located in its hind legs. The preorbital glands, larger in males than in females, are frequently opened in response to certain stimuli.

Each of the antlers has three lines on it. The brow tine (the first division in the antler) is roughly perpendicular to the beam (the central stalk of the antler). Antlers, as in most other cervids, are shed annually. The antlers emerge as soft tissues (known as velvet antlers) and progressively harden into bony structures (known as hard antlers), following mineralisation and blockage of blood vessels in the tissue, from the tip to the base. A study of the mineral composition of the antlers of captive barasinga, chital, and hog deer showed that the antlers of the deer are very similar. The mineral content of the chital's antlers was determined to be (per kg)  copper,  cobalt, and  zinc.

The toes taper to a point. Compared to the hog deer, the chital has a more cursorial build. The antlers and brow tines are longer than those in the hog deer. The pedicles (the bony cores from which antlers arise) are shorter, and the auditory bullae are smaller in the chital. The chital may be confused with the fallow deer. Chital have several white spots, whereas fallow deer usually have white splotches. Fallow also have palmate antlers whereas chital have 3 distinct points on each side. The chital has a prominent white patch on its throat, while the throat of the fallow deer is completely white. The biggest distinction is the dark brown stripe running down the chital's back. The hairs are smooth and flexible.

Distribution and habitat
The chital ranges over 8–30°N in India and through Nepal, Bhutan, Bangladesh, and Sri Lanka. The western limit of its range is eastern Rajasthan and Gujarat. The eastern limit of its range is through western Assam to the Sunderbans of West Bengal and Bangladesh. Andaman and Nicobar Islands  and Sri Lanka are the southern limits. Chital occur sporadically in the forested areas throughout the rest of the Indian peninsula. Within Bangladesh, it currently only exists in the Sundarbans and some ecoparks situated around the Bay of Bengal, as it became extinct in the central and north-east of the country.

Australia
The chital was the first species of deer introduced into Australia in the early 1800s by Dr. John Harris, surgeon to the New South Wales Corps, and he had about 400 of these animals on his property by 1813. These did not survive, and the primary range of the chital is now confined to a few cattle stations in North Queensland near Charters Towers and several feral herds on the NSW north and south coasts. While some of the stock originated from Sri Lanka (Ceylon), the Indian race likely is also represented.

The United States
In the 1860s, axis deer were introduced to the island of Molokai, Hawaii, as a gift from Hong Kong to King Kamehameha V. The deer were introduced to Lanai, another of the Hawaiian Islands, soon afterward and are now plentiful on both islands. The deer were introduced to Maui island in the 1950s to increase hunting opportunities. Because the deer have no natural predators on the Hawaiian islands, their population is growing 20 to 30% each year, causing serious damage to agriculture and natural areas.

Releasing them on the island of Hawaii was planned, as well, but this was abandoned after pressure from scientists over damage to landscapes caused by the deer on other islands. In 2012, deer were spotted on the island of Hawaii; wildlife officials believe people had flown the deer by helicopter and transported them by boat onto the island. In August 2012, a helicopter pilot pleaded guilty to transporting four axis deer from Maui to Hawaii. Hawaiian law now prohibits "the intentional possession or interisland transportation or release of wild or feral deer."

In 1932, axis deer were introduced to Texas. In 1988, self-sustaining herds were found in 27 counties, located in Central and South Texas. The deer are most populous on the Edwards Plateau, where the land is similar to that of India.

Croatia
Chital of unknown origin were introduced to the islands of Brijuni in 1911. They also live on Rab Island. The population on the islands comprised about 200 individuals as of 2010. Attempts by hunters to introduce the species to the mainland of Croatia were unsuccessful.

Behaviour and ecology

Chital are active throughout the day. In the summer, time is spent in rest under shade, and the sun's glare is avoided if the temperature reaches ; activity peaks as dusk approaches. As days grow cooler, foraging begins before sunrise and peaks by early morning. Activity slows down during midday, when the animals rest or loiter about slowly. Foraging recommences by late afternoon and continues till midnight. They fall asleep a few hours before sunrise, typically in the forest which is cooler than the glades. These deer typically move in a single file on specific tracks, with a distance of two to three times their width between them, when on a journey, typically in search of food and water sources. A study in the Gir National Park (Gujarat, India) showed that chital travel the most in summer of all seasons.

When cautiously inspecting its vicinity, the chital stands motionless and listens with rapt attention, facing the potential danger, if any. This stance may be adopted by nearby individuals, as well. As an antipredator measure, chital flee in groups (unlike the hog deer that disperse on alarm); sprints are often followed by hiding in dense undergrowth. The running chital has its tail raised, exposing the white underparts. The chital can leap and clear fences as high as  but prefers to dive under them. It stays within  of cover.

A gregarious animal, the chital forms matriarchal herds comprising an adult female and her offspring of the previous and the present year, which may be associated with individuals of any age and either sex, male herds, and herds of juveniles and mothers. Small herds are common, though aggregations of as many as 100 individuals have been observed. Groups are loose and disband frequently, save for the juvenile-mother herd. Herd membership in Texas is typically up to 15; herds can have five to 40 members in India. Studies in the Nallamala Hills (Andhra Pradesh, India) and the Western Ghats (western coast of India) showed seasonal variation in the sex ratio of herds; this was attributed to the tendency of females to isolate themselves ahead of parturition. Similarly, rutting males leave their herds during the mating season, hence altering the herd composition. Large herds are most common in monsoon, observed foraging in the grasslands.

Predators of chitals include Indian wolves, Bengal tigers, Asiatic lions, leopards, pythons, dholes, Indian pariah dogs, bears, and crocodiles. Fishing cats, jungle cats, foxes, golden jackals and eagles target juveniles. Males are less vulnerable than females and juveniles.

A vocal animal, the chital, akin to the North American elk, gives out bellows and alarm barks. Its calls are, however, not as strong as those of elk or red deer; they are mainly coarse bellows or loud growls. Bellowing coincides with rutting. Dominant males guarding females in oestrus make high-pitched growls at less powerful males. Males may moan during aggressive displays or while resting. Chital, mainly females and juveniles, bark persistently when alarmed or if they encounter a predator. Fawns in search of their mother often squeal. The chital can respond to the alarm calls of several animals, such as the common myna and langurs.

Marking behaviour is pronounced in males. Males have well-developed preorbital glands (near the eyes). They stand on their hind legs to reach tall branches and rub the open preorbital glands to deposit their scent there. This posture is also used while foraging. Urine marking is also observed; the smell of urine is typically stronger than that of the deposited scent. Sparring between males begins with the larger male displaying his dominance before the other; this display consists of hissing heading away from the other male with the tail facing him, the nose pointing to the ground, the ears down, the antlers upright, and the upper lip raised. The fur often bristles during the display. The male approaches the other in a slow gait. Males with velvet antlers may hunch over instead of standing erect as the males with hard antlers. The opponents then interlock their horns and push against each other, with the smaller male producing a sound at times which is louder than that produced by sambar deer, but not as much as the barasinga's. The fight terminates with the males stepping backward, or simply leaving and foraging. Fights are not generally serious.

Individuals may occasionally bite one another. Common mynas are often attracted to the chital. An interesting relationship has been observed between herds of chital and troops of the northern plains grey langurs, a widespread South Asian monkey. Chital benefit from the langurs' eyesight and ability to post a lookout from trees, while the langur benefit from the chital's strong sense of smell, both of which help keep a check on potential danger. The chital also benefit from fruits dropped by langurs from trees such as Terminalia bellirica and Phyllanthus emblica. The chital has been observed foraging with sambar deer in the Western Ghats.

Diet

Grazers as well as browsers, the chital mainly feed on grasses throughout the year. They prefer young shoots, in the absence of which, tall and coarse grasses are nibbled off at the tips. Browse forms a major portion of the diet only in the winter-October to January-when the grasses, tall or dried up, are no longer palatable. Browse includes herbs, shrubs, foliage, fruits, and forbs; Moghania species are often preferred while browsing. Fruits eaten by chital in the Kanha National Park (Madhya Pradesh, India) include those of Ficus species from January to May, Cordia myxa from May to June, and Syzygium cumini from June to July. Individuals tend to group together and forage while moving slowly. Chital are generally silent when grazing together. Males often stand on their hindlegs to reach tall branches. Water holes are visited nearly twice daily, with great caution. In the Kanha National Park, mineral licks rich in calcium and phosphorus pentoxide were scraped at by the incisors. Chital also gnaw bones and fallen antlers for their minerals. Males in velvet indulge in such osteophagia to a greater extent. Chital in the Sunderbans may be omnivores; remains of red crabs have been found in the rumen of individuals.

Reproduction

Breeding takes place throughout the year, with peaks that vary geographically. Sperm is produced year-round, though testosterone levels register a fall during the development of the antlers. Females have regular oestrus cycles, each lasting three weeks. The female can conceive again two weeks to four months after the birth. Males sporting hard antlers are dominant over those in velvet or those without antlers, irrespective of their size. Courtship is based on tending bonds. A rutting male fasts during the mating season and follows and guards a female in oestrus. The pair does several bouts of chasing and mutual licking before copulation.

The newborn is hidden for a week after birth, a period much shorter than most other deer. The mother-fawn bond is not very strong, as the two get separated often, though they can reunite easily as the herds are cohesive. If the fawn dies, the mother can breed once again so as to give birth twice that year. The males continue their growth till seven to eight years. The average lifespan in captivity is nearly 22 years. The longevity in the wild, however, is merely five to ten years.

The chital is found in large numbers in dense deciduous or semievergreen forests and open grasslands. The highest numbers of chital are found in the forests of India, where they feed upon tall grass and shrubs. Chital have been also spotted in Phibsoo Wildlife Sanctuary in Bhutan, which has the only remaining natural sal (Shorea robusta) forest in the country. They do not occur at high altitudes, where they are usually replaced by other species such as the sambar deer. They also prefer heavy forest cover for shade and avoid direct sunlight.

Conservation status
The chital is listed on the IUCN Red List as least concern "because it occurs over a very wide range within which there are many large populations". Currently, no range-wide threats to chitals are present, and they live in many protected areas. However, population densities are below ecological carrying capacity in many places due to hunting and competition with domestic livestock. Hunting for the deer's meat has caused substantial declines and local extinctions. The axis deer is protected under Schedule III of the Indian Wildlife Protection Act (1972) and under the Wildlife (Preservation) (Amendment) Act, 1974 of Bangladesh. Two primary reasons for its good conservation status are its legal protection as a species and a network of functioning protected areas.

The chital has been introduced to the Andaman Islands, Argentina, Australia, Brazil, Chile, Mexico, Paraguay, Uruguay, Alabama, Point Reyes National Seashore in California, Florida, Hawaii, Mississippi, and Texas in the United States, and the Veliki Brijun Island in the Brijuni Archipelago of the Istrian Peninsula in Croatia.

With effect from 2 August 2022, the European Union added the chital to the list of invasive alien species and banned its import into the EU.

See also
 Sri Lankan axis deer
 Sambar deer
 Barasingha

References

External links
 

Articles containing video clips
Axis
Fauna of South Asia
Introduced animals of Hawaii
Introduced mammals of Australia
Mammals described in 1777
Mammals of Asia
Mammals of Bangladesh
Mammals of India
Mammals of Nepal
Taxa named by Johann Christian Polycarp Erxleben
Taxa named by Charles Hamilton Smith